The 1948 World Table Tennis Championships – Swaythling Cup (men's team) was the 15th edition of the men's team championship.  

Czechoslovakia won the gold medal defeating France 5–2 in the final.

Medalists

Team

Swaythling Cup tables

Pool A

+withdrew

Pool B

Pool C

+ withdrew

Pool D

+ withdrew

Semifinals

Final

See also
List of World Table Tennis Championships medalists

References

-